Rigels Nezaj (born 29 February 1988) is an Albanian football player. He is a forward and plays for Dinamo Tirana in the Albanian Superliga

Dinamo Tirana
He was a sub in Dinamo Tirana's UEFA Cup game against CSKA Sofia on 27 July 2006.

References

External links
 Profile - FSHF

1988 births
Living people
Association football forwards
Albanian footballers
FK Dinamo Tirana players
Kategoria e Tretë players